The 1828 United States presidential election in New Hampshire took place between October 31 and December 2, 1828, as part of the 1828 United States presidential election. Voters chose eight representatives, or electors to the Electoral College, who voted for President and Vice President.

New Hampshire voted for the National Republican candidate, John Quincy Adams, over the Democratic candidate, Andrew Jackson. Adams won New Hampshire by a margin of 8.2%.

Results

See also
 United States presidential elections in New Hampshire

References

New Hampshire
1828
1828 New Hampshire elections